Jinde Meriye is a 2020 Indian Punjabi romance film directed by Pankaj Batra. The film stars Parmish Verma, Sonam Bajwa, Yuvraj Hans and Navneet Kaur Dhillon in the lead roles The film is produced by Pankaj Batra, Ashu Munish Sahni, Aniket Kawade, Preeta Batra and Amandeep Singh and co-produced by Mandip Dhami. It was released in cinemas on 24 January 2020. This film will World Television Premiere on 3rd July 2021 on Pitaara TV.

Synopsis 
Yaadi, a happy-go-lucky person, and Rehmat are childhood friends who turned love birds and planned to get married. Rehmat's family is against the decision as Yaadi carries a careless attitude towards his future. To get Rehmat, Yaadi must stand on his own and have a prosperous career. However, Yaadi chooses an illegal way to be successful, which infuriates Rehmat, making her leave Yaadi forever. Will Yaadi be able to win Rehmat back?The answer is no and even yes because in the last scene it concluded that Yaddi become most wanted man in Scotland. After that he realised that money is not everything! Finally apologise to rehmat and asked her to live together a happy life.Her boyfriend,yuvi gives a way to Yaddi to go back India .however, Yaddi was caught up by cops and woman police officer(Navneet kaur dhillion) and shotted 3 bullets leading to his death.later on rehmat started crying on his death but soon we see that Yaddi open his eyes in the van.

Cast
 Parmish Verma as Yaadi/Champion
 Sonam Bajwa as Rehmat
 Yuvraj Hans as Yuvi
 Navneet Kaur Dhillon
 Malkeet Rauni
Lakhwir Grewal as Sandhu
 Hobby Dhaliwal as Bhai
 Anita Devgan as Yaadi's Mother
 Hardeep Gill as Rehmat's Father

Soundtrack 

Soundtrack of the film was composed by Desi Crew, Troy Arif and DJ Strings whereas lyrics were penned by Mandeep Mavi, Laddi Chahal, Sukh Sohal and Kahlon.

References

External links
 
 

2020 films
Indian romance films
Punjabi-language Indian films
2020s Punjabi-language films
Films directed by Pankaj Batra
2020 romance films